The Waushara County Courthouse, Waushara County Sheriff's Residence and Jail is a pair of buildings in Wautoma, Wisconsin that are together listed on the U.S. National Register of Historic Places.

The Waushara County Sheriff's Residence and Jail is a brick Georgian Revival building (pictured at right) at 221 S Ste. Marie Street designed by C. H. Williams and built in 1908 The sheriff and his family lived in the front and the jail cells were in back. This building is now a museum of the Waushara County Historical Society.

The Waushara County Courthouse is a Classical Revival-style building  at 209 Ste. Marie Street designed by E. A. Stubenrauch and built in 1928. The courthouse building is monumental in scale. A 1981 review of historic courthouses in the state described this courthouse, along with several others in other counties, as "Simple in both overall concept and decoration [and including] the essential Neoclassical portico and symmetrical disposition of elements at a scale befitting landmarks in their communities; that simplicity is enhanced by the evident care with which the buildings and sites are maintained."

The buildings were listed on the National Register of Historic Places in 1982.

References

External links
 Waushara County Historical Society - museum website

Jails on the National Register of Historic Places in Wisconsin
Houses on the National Register of Historic Places in Wisconsin
Neoclassical architecture in Wisconsin
Government buildings completed in 1928
Buildings and structures in Waushara County, Wisconsin
County courthouses in Wisconsin
Jails in Wisconsin
Museums in Waushara County, Wisconsin
History museums in Wisconsin
National Register of Historic Places in Waushara County, Wisconsin